The Cyprus arc is part of the plate boundary zone that accommodates the motion of the African Plate relative to the Anatolian Plate. It is an arcuate depression located in the southern reaches of Cyprus. The Cyprus arc is considered to be in collision between the African and Eurasian plates.

References

Geology of Cyprus